Blood on the Dance Floor was an American electronic music group from Orlando, Florida, formed in 2006. The group's longest standing lineup, from 2009 to 2016, consisted of Jesus David Torres also known as Dahvie Vanity (born 1984) and Jayy Von Monroe (born 1991). The group released nine studio albums before breaking up in 2016 following Von Monroe's departure. It was reformed by Vanity the following year, initially with Fallon Vendetta. After Vendetta's departure, Vanity became the sole member of the group. Since 2019, Vanity has performed under the name Kawaii Monster and most recently the Most Vivid Nightmares.

History 
Around September 2006, Jesus David Torres,  also known as "Dahvie Vanity", on his 22nd birthday (he was born in 1984) started a trio called Love the Fashion with Christopher Mongillo and Rebecca Fugate. The group was originally nothing more than a joke but soon developed into Blood on the Dance Floor in 2007. The group self-released their first album, Let's Start a Riot, in April 2008. Not being able to tour, Mongillo and Fugate left the band while Vanity toured the Orlando, Florida area.

During the recording of their second album, It's Hard to be a Diamond in a Rhinestone World, Mongillo and Fugate left, and the band was picked up by producer and writer Rusty Wilmot. During the recording of this album, Garrett Marshal McLaughlin (Garrett Ecstasy) was recruited to do backup vocals and screaming. The CD was self-released in October 2008. Only 300 copies were made.

Vanity and Ecstasy recorded the singles "Siq With a Q" and "Suicide Club" as a duo in 2008, and released three extended plays over the first half of 2009, I Scream I Scream, OMFG Sneak Peak, and Extended Play. The duo embarked on the OMFG Tour with other local bands Electric Valentine, Weston Buck, The Greenlight District, and The Crush in promotion of their upcoming album then titled OMFG.

During the OMFG tour on a tour date in the state of Colorado, Vanity was arrested for sexual assault but was ultimately not criminally charged due to a lack of evidence and the tour continued with Ecstasy performing the remainder of the shows without Vanity. Ecstasy then left the band after accusing Vanity of being a sexual predator and was replaced by Jeremy Brian Griffis, known by his stage name "Jayy Von Monroe". Along with Von Monroe, Vanity and the group's new drummer and rapper, Nick "Nasty" Wenzel, released "Horrifically Delicious".

Many of the songs originally recorded with Ecstasy intended for the upcoming album OMFG were re-recorded with new vocals by Von Monroe. The previous concept of the OMFG album was scrapped, and rebranded as EPIC, set for release in 2010. The band went on tour over spring and summer 2010 to promote the release of Epic. With Jeffree Star they recorded three songs for that album. The collaborations with Jeffree Star were short lived because like former member Garrett Ecstasy, Star had also accused Vanity of being a pedophile and a predator, claiming to have witnessed questionable behavior. Star later chose to go back on his accusations and sweep what he claimed to have seen under the rug due to feeling like the band was being victimized. He was then featured on their 2014 single "Poison Apple", from the album Bitchcraft. As with the previous conflict with Garrett, the three singles featuring Jeffree's vocals were re-recorded with vocals by Von Monroe, and the original tracks were not featured on the final album.

In October 2010, the album Epic charted No. 5 on the dance/electronic Billboard chart. The band headlined the Epic Tour and the Epic Tour Part II in support of the album.

Even before the release of Epic, recording began for Blood on the Dance Floor's fourth album, All the Rage!!. The duo collaborated with several artists for the album, including Lady Nogrady, JJ Demon, and Nick Nasty. The album was preceded by several singles to promote the release, including "Yo Ho", and "P.L.U.R.", and "Bewitched" which became the band's biggest (and only) most well known song. The band later embarked on Warped Tour 2011 in June 2011, and released the album while on tour.

A music video for their hit single from the album, "Bewitched", featured Nicole "Lady" Nogrady, who later said that she felt disrespected by the band during production of the album as well as on the music video, and found herself having to confront the band directly in order for her name to appear on the credits of her work with them. The song was subsequently performed by other female vocalists in place of Nogrady at live shows, and was re-recorded with vocals by Haley Rose for their 2013 acoustic album Blood Unplugged.

The album peaked at No. 13 on the Billboard Top Electronic Albums chart. At the end of 2011, the duo headlined the All the Rage Tour and was planning the 'Tis the Season to be Killing Tour.

In celebration of BOTDF's fourth anniversary, a digital compilation album entitled The Legend of Blood on the Dance Floor was set to be released on Halloween. The compilation's release date was pushed back, originally planned to be released as a CD, it was released as a SoundCloud playlist instead. The compilation features remastered versions of songs from the band's first four albums.

Blood on the Dance Floor's fifth album, Evolution, was released on June 19, 2012 along with a deluxe edition that featured acoustic versions of two songs. Two music videos and four singles were released from the album.

The album featured tracks in collaboration with Haley Rose, Amelia Arsenic, Shawn Brandon, Joel Madden of the band Good Charlotte, Elena Vladimirova, and Deuce.

As a thank you to their fans they released the three-song free EP Clubbed to Death! on June 20, 2012, for free through an app on Facebook. Their sixth EP, The Anthem of the Outcast, was released on October 30, 2012.

Rumors of a breakup in 2013 were proven to be a hoax. Bad Blood was slated for release in September 2013. On February 18, 2013, the lead single "I Refuse to Sink! (Fuck the Fame)" was released, followed by the second single, "Crucified by Your Lies", and a third, "Something Grimm", on July 2, 2013.

Andrew "Drew" Apathy joined in early 2014, and a new album, Bitchcraft, was released in June 2014. Their single "We're Takin over!" featuring Deuce was released February 7.

Blood on the Dance Floor released their first single off their EP Cruel Pornography: "The Sexorcist". In August, they released their new project and started planning the "Reign of Blood" tour. On February 14, 2016, the band released the single "Safe Word" on iTunes.

Mid-2016 marked the end of producing and co-writing by Rusty Wilmot (2008–2016).

In April 2016, Blood on the Dance Floor announced a 24-date tour with Steven Joseph and BrokenCYDE. On August 17, BOTDF released their September 30-scheduled album Scissors on Apple Music.

On September 14, 2016, Dahvie Vanity said that the group would be disbanding after one final tour as a result of Jayy's departure earlier that month. For a while afterwards, Vanity created and worked on a new project called Sinners Are Winners, releasing an EP titled For Beginners and full-length The Invocation. Jayy Von Monroe also released a statement on his departure from the band after leaving stating that he was not paid for his time for the band and was forced to go on tour without treatment after his HIV diagnosis. Vanity denied these allegations in a video.

In April 2017, Vanity announced that there would be a new member, and that Blood on the Dance Floor would be returning on May 5 of that year without Jayy Von Monroe. In May 2017, it was revealed that Dahvie's girlfriend, Fallon Vendetta, had temporarily joined Blood on the Dance Floor. With Vendetta, they released the singles "Resurrection Spell", "Love Like Voodoo", "Six Feet Under", "Yo Ho 2 (Pirate's Life)", "Ghosting" and "Destroy". Their album Kawaii Monster was released on October 31, 2017. Kawaii Monster pre-orders included a second disc, a remastered edition of Let's Start a Riot. The band also released an exclusive EP: You Are the Heart. In 2018, they released Haunted, followed by Cinema Erotica and You Are the Heart. Vendetta departed the group shortly afterward, leaving Vanity as the sole remaining member of the group.

In 2019, shortly after the band's second break up, Vanity started a new project: Kawaii Monster. He released the songs "From Heaven to Hell", "Total Nightmare", "Dear Best Friend", "It's a Sunny Place for Shady People", "I Am With You", "Finding Blessings in Dark Places", "The Violet Flame", "It's All Just a Dream" and "Rage Against the Dying Light".

After a five-month break from making music, Vanity rebranded himself again as "The Most Vivid Nightmares" and released "Drowning in the Darkness" on November 13, 2020. He later released a second single: "Love Forever True". On January 1, 2021, Vanity released a new version of Blood on the Dance Floor's "Bewitched" as "Bewitched Reimagined" featuring singer Sammy Beare. As of 2016, Jayy Von Monroe has continued to work as a drag monster under the name "The Dahli" and Vanity has continued to release music and merchandise by himself under both "The Most Vivid Nightmares" and "Dark Arts Official".

Musical style and influences 

The group's style has been described as having hypersexual lyrics combined with electronica or electronic music, but also heavily incorporates electropop, dance-pop, and crunkcore.

Vanity stated in an interview that Jeffree Star is a huge influence on Blood on the Dance Floor. Vanity also stated that he was inspired by Marilyn Manson in the past.

Sexual assault allegations against Dahvie Vanity 

Since the allegations first surfaced in 2009, at least 21 women have made sexual assault, child molestation, and rape allegations against Vanity. Former bandmates Garrett Ecstasy, who left the band in 2009, and Jayy Von Monroe, who left in 2016, have described Vanity as a sexual predator. In an interview with television journalist Chris Hansen, Jayy Von Monroe accused Vanity of abuse as well, stating that Vanity forced him to tour without his HIV medication which caused him to nearly contract AIDS. Von Monroe also stated that he later made a full recovery after leaving the band in 2016. Jeffree Star and New Years Day members Ash Costello and Nikki Misery have stated that they observed Vanity engage in questionable or illegal sexual behavior during one of the Vans Warped Tours and also during the "All the Rage Tour 2012" in support of their third studio album of the same name around the early 2010s.<ref>Rachel Campbell (August 1, 2018) Blood On The Dance Floor's Dahvie Vanity accused of sexual assault, Alternative Press, accessed March 18, 2020</ref> Many of the accusers were underage during the alleged attacks. In response to the allegations, Combichrist removed Blood on the Dance Floor from their tour in 2014. Merchandising website Big Cartel removed the band's products in 2018 in response to the allegations, while Spotify and Google Play removed the band's music in April 2019 for violating their prohibited content policies against hate speech. Vanity has responded to the accusations on multiple occasions, usually with denial, threats or evasion.

In early 2020, Hansen announced an investigation on Vanity, including having multiple interviews with those who claim Vanity abused or raped them. The FBI have confirmed that they are also currently investigating the allegations against Vanity.

 Members 
Final line-up
 Dahvie Vanity – lead vocals, guitar, keyboards, programming (2006–2016, 2017–2019)

Former members

 Christopher Mongillo – backing vocals, programming, guitar (2007–2008) 
 Rebecca Fugate – keyboards, backing vocals, backing vocals (2007–2008)
 Garrett Ecstasy – backing vocals, occasional lead vocals (2008–2009)
 Jayy Von Monroe – lead vocals (2009–2016)
 Matty M – backing vocals (2009)
 Fallon Vendetta – lead vocals (2017–2018)

Touring musicians

 Brandy Wynn – violin (2012–2013)
 Haley Rose – vocals (2012–2013)
 Carter Harris – keyboards (2011–2012)
 Johnny Awford – bass, drums (2011)
 Nick Nasty – drums, vocals (2009, 2010–2011)
 Rusty Wilmot – guitar, bass keyboards, drums (2009–2011)
 Alex Gilbertson – bass (2011)
 Brian Carpenter – drums (2012) 
 Ryan Mulroy – guitar (2012)

Timeline

Discography

 Albums as Blood on the Dance Floor 

 Let's Start a Riot (2008)
 It's Hard to Be a Diamond in a Rhinestone World (2008)
 Epic (2010)
 All the Rage!! (2011)
 Evolution (2012)
 Bad Blood (2013)
 Bitchcraft (2014)
 Scissors (2016)
 Kawaii Monster (2017)
 Haunted (2018)
 Cinema Erotica (2018)
 You Are the Heart (2018)
 Hollywood Death Star (2019)

 Albums as Kawaii Monster 

 Love from Hell (2019)
 The Balance (2020)

 Albums as Master of Death 

 Master of Death (2015)

 Albums as Sinners Are Winners 

 For Beginners (2016)
 The Invocation'' (2017)

References

External links

 

Musical groups from Orlando, Florida
Electronic music groups from Florida
Electronic music duos
Crunkcore groups
American pop music groups
American dance music groups
Musical groups established in 2007
American musical duos
2007 establishments in Florida
Musical groups disestablished in 2016
2016 disestablishments in Florida